John Victor McNeil (10 July 1890 – 5 September 1936) was an Australian rules footballer who played with Essendon in the Victorian Football League (VFL).

McNeil was recruited from Prahran during the 1913 season.

Notes

External links 
		

1890 births
1936 deaths
Australian rules footballers from Melbourne
Prahran Football Club players
Essendon Football Club players
People from West Melbourne, Victoria